Lemar, LeMar, or Le Mar is a surname. Notable people with the surname include:
 Roland Lemar (born 1976), American politician
 Thomas Lemar (born 1995), French footballer
 Florence LeMar (1890–1951), stage name of Florence Gardiner, an athlete and entertainer
 Joseph LeMar, American paralympic athlete
 Angie Le Mar (born 1965), British comedian, actor, and writer

See also
 Lemar (given name)